The 2013 Collingwood Football Club season is the club's 117th season of senior competition in the Australian Football League (AFL). The club also fielded its reserves team in the VFL.

The club signed a total of 80,456 members for the 2013 season, setting a new VFL/AFL record for total club membership in a season.

Squad
 Players are listed by guernsey number, and 2013 statistics are for AFL regular season and finals series matches during the 2013 AFL season only. Career statistics include a player's complete AFL career, which, as a result, means that a player's debut and part or whole of their career statistics may be for another club. Statistics are correct as of 2nd Elimination Final of the 2013 season (7 September 2013) and are taken from AFL Tables

Squad changes

In

Out

Season summary

Pre-season matches

Regular season

Finals series

Ladder

Awards, Records & Milestones

AFL Awards
 AFLCA's Champion Player of the Year – Scott Pendlebury
 AFLCA's Assistant Coach of the Year – Robert Harvey
 Member of the 2013 All-Australian team (left-wingman) – Scott Pendlebury
 Member of the 2013 All-Australian team (centre half-forward) – Travis Cloke
 Member of the 2013 All-Australian team (ruck rover) – Dane Swan
 Jason McCartney Medal – Scott Pendlebury (Round 1)
 Bob Rose-Charlie Sutton Medal – Heath Shaw (Round 12)
 2013 AFL Mark of the Year – Jamie Elliott (Round 14)

AFL Award Nominations
 Round 5 – 2013 AFL Mark of the Year nomination – Jarryd Blair
 Round 12 – 2013 AFL Mark of the Year nomination – Heath Shaw
 Round 15 – 2013 AFL Goal of the Year nomination – Sam Dwyer
 Round 16 – 2013 AFL Mark of the Year nomination – Travis Cloke
 Round 17 – 2013 AFL Mark of the Year nomination – Jamie Elliott
 Round 18 – 2013 AFL Rising Star nomination – Marley Williams
 Round 21 – 2013 AFL Goal of the Year nomination – Dayne Beams
 Round 22 – 2013 AFL Rising Star nomination – Brodie Grundy
 Round 23 – 2013 AFL Goal of the Year nomination – Alan Didak
 Jim Stynes Community Leadership Award nomination – Nick Maxwell

Club Awards
  – Scott Pendlebury
  – Dane Swan
  – Steele Sidebottom
  – Travis Cloke
  – Harry O'Brien
  – Kyle Martin
  – Scott Pendlebury
  – Josh Thomas
  – Travis Cloke
  – Jarryd Blair
  – Dane Swan
 Magpie Army Player of the Year – Dane Swan

Milestones
 Round 1 – Sam Dwyer (AFL debut)
 Round 1 – Jack Frost (AFL debut)
 Round 1 – Josh Thomas (AFL debut)
 Round 1 – Quinten Lynch (Collingwood debut)
 Round 1 – Jordan Russell (Collingwood debut)
 Round 2 – Scott Pendlebury (150 games)
 Round 3 – Ben Hudson (Collingwood debut)
 Round 4 – Dane Swan (200 games)
 Round 5 – Scott Pendlebury (100 goals)
 Round 6 – Jarrod Witts (AFL debut)
 Round 6 – Ben Kennedy (AFL debut)
 Round 6 – Darren Jolly (50 Collingwood goals)
 Round 10 – Kyle Martin (AFL debut)
 Round 11 – Travis Cloke (300 goals)
 Round 11 – Adam Oxley (AFL debut)
 Round 15 – Clinton Young (Collingwood debut)
 Round 16 – Luke Ball (200 games)
 Round 16 – Steele Sidebottom (100 games)
 Round 16 – Andrew Krakouer (150 goals)
 Round 18 – Brodie Grundy (AFL debut)
 Round 20 – Tyson Goldsack (100 games)
 Round 20 – Nick Maxwell (100 games as captain)
 Round 22 – Brent Macaffer (50 games)
 2nd Elimination Final – Travis Cloke (350 goals)

VFL season

Results

Ladder

Notes
 Key

 H ^ Home match.
 A ^ Away match.

 Notes
Collingwood's scores are indicated in bold font.

References

External links
 Official website of the Collingwood Football Club
 Official website of the Australian Football League

2013
Collingwood Football Club